Evan Bacon (born 1997 or 1998) is an American LEGO-artist and software developer.

His artistic debut came in 2011, when he displayed a life-sized LEGO Batman sculpture at Brick Fiesta for Adam West. His Batman sculpture was awarded "Best Artistic", "Best Youth Creation", and "People's Choice Award" at Brick Fiesta 2011.  Following the initial success, Evan went on to construct LEGO sculptures full-time; building Iron Man, Superman, and Captain Kirk. 
Evan was awarded a Best of Austin award from The Austin Chronicle for his Breast Cancer awareness model.
In 2013 Evan turned his attention to the video game industry, collaborating with Rooster Teeth he built a Life-Size LEGO Minion from Despicable Me at RTX.

Awards and nominations

References

Living people
American artists
Lego people
Year of birth missing (living people)